Biruaslum or Bioruaslam is a stack in the Barra Isles of Scotland, to the west of Vatersay.  Approximately  from the nearest road, it reaches  in height and there is a ruined prehistoric fort on the southern side. Francis G. Thompson characterizes it as "high and virtually inaccessible";  James Fisher mentions a "fulmar flying up and down its tiny cliff."

Cliff-fort

The style of the fort is similar to Iron Age structures known from Ireland but the only datable finds so far discovered are of Neolithic pottery.

See also
 Funzie Girt

Notes

References
Keith Branigan (2007) Ancient Barra: exploring the Archaeology of the Outer Hebrides. Comhairle nan Eilean Siar.
 Francis G. Thompson (1974) The Uists and Barra. David and Charles.
 James Fisher Rockall: The Islet of Birds.

Barra Isles
Stacks of Scotland